Ngoy is a surname. Notable people with the surname include:

Ngoy Bomboko (born 1975), retired Congolese football player
Charles Lokoli-Ngoy (born 1997), Australian professional footballer
Aimé Ngoy Mukena, political figure from the Democratic Republic of the Congo
Eugene Kabongo Ngoy (born 1960), Congolese former professional footballer
Francis Dady Ngoy (born 1990), Congolese professional footballer
Julien Ngoy (born 1997), Belgian footballer
Kisula Ngoy (1940–2018), Congolese politician and doctor
Krom Ngoy (1865–1936), Khmer poet and a master of Kse diev
Michaël Ngoy (born 1982), Swiss former professional ice hockey defenceman
Ted Ngoy (born 1942), Cambodian American owner of doughnut shops in California
Trésor Kapuku Ngoy, Congolese businessman, politician and Christian minister
Ngoy Nsumbu (born 1972), retired Congolese football midfielder
Ngoy Srin (born 1994), Cambodian footballer

See also
Ngoy District, a district (muang) of Luang Prabang province in northern Laos
Kongo-language surnames